

Eduard Emil Karl Zorn (8 August 1901 – 4 February 1945) was a German officer in the Wehrmacht during World War II. He was a recipient of the Knight's Cross of the Iron Cross with Oak Leaves of Nazi Germany. Zorn was killed on 4 February 1945 in the Colmar Pocket. He was posthumously promoted to Generalmajor and awarded the Oak Leaves to his Knight's Cross.

Awards and decorations
 Iron Cross (1939) 2nd Class (18 December 1939) & 1st Class (28 May 1940)

 Knight's Cross of the Iron Cross with Oak Leaves
 Knight's Cross on 25 December 1944 as Oberst i.G. and commander of 189.Infanterie-Division
 739th Oak Leaves on 16 February 1945 as Oberst i.G. and commander of 189.Infanterie-Division

References

Citations

Bibliography

 
 

1901 births
1945 deaths
Military personnel from Munich
Major generals of the German Army (Wehrmacht)
Reichswehr personnel
People from the Kingdom of Bavaria
Recipients of the Knight's Cross of the Iron Cross with Oak Leaves
German Army personnel killed in World War II
Burials at Munich Waldfriedhof
German Army generals of World War II